Léon Rigon (born 19 August 1885, date of death unknown) was a French equestrian. He competed in two events at the 1924 Summer Olympics.

References

External links
 

1885 births
Year of death missing
French male equestrians
Olympic equestrians of France
Equestrians at the 1924 Summer Olympics
Place of birth missing